Jae Thaxton (born September 9, 1985) is a former American football linebacker. He most recently played for the Calgary Stampeders.

A native of Hartwell, Georgia, Thaxton attended Hart County High School and went on to play at Florida State. After an outstanding true freshman season, Thaxton missed most of his sophomore year after struggling to return from a concussion.

References

External links 
Florida State Seminoles bio

1985 births
Living people
American football linebackers
Florida State Seminoles football players
Calgary Stampeders players
People from Hartwell, Georgia